Baltic Skies is a 1960 Soviet drama film directed by Vladimir Vengerov.

Plot 
The film tells about military pilots defending Leningrad during World War II.

Cast 
 Pyotr Glebov as Lunin (as P. Glebov)
 Vsevolod Platov as Serov (as V. Platov)
 Mikhail Ulyanov as Rassokhin (as M. Ulyanov)
 Rolan Bykov as Kabankov (as R. Rolan)
 Mikhail Kozakov as Bayseitov (as M. Kazakov)
 Nikolai Klyuchnev as Chepyolkin (as N. Klyuchnev)
 Eve Kivi as Khikda (as E. Kivi)
 Inna Kondrateva as Mariya Sergeyevna (as I. Kondrateva)

References

External links 
 

1960 films
1960s Russian-language films
Soviet drama films
Soviet black-and-white films
Eastern Front of World War II films
Films set in 1941
Films set in 1942
Films set in 1943
Films set in Saint Petersburg
Russian aviation films
1960 drama films
Russian black-and-white films
Russian drama films